Petrophile cyathiforma is a species of flowering plant in the family Proteaceae and is endemic to southwestern Western Australia. It is a small shrub with needle-shaped, sharply-pointed leaves and cup-shaped heads of glabrous, bright yellow flowers.

Description

Taxonomy
Petrophile cyathiforma was first formally described in 1995 by Donald Bruce Foreman in Flora of Australia from material collected near Hyden in 1966. The specific epithet (cyathiforma) means "cup-shaped", referring to shape of the flower head, as a result of the bracts at its base.

Distribution and habitat
This petrophile grows in low mallee, low scrub and heath and on sandplain from near Corrigin to the Fitzgerald River National Park in the Avon Wheatbelt, Coolgardie, Esperance Plains and Mallee biogeographic regions of southwestern Western Australia.

Conservation status
Petrophile cyathiforma is classified as "not threatened" by the Western Australian Government Department of Parks and Wildlife.

References

cyathiforma
Eudicots of Western Australia
Endemic flora of Western Australia
Plants described in 1995